Iker Iturbe (born 10 July 1976) is a Clemson Alumni men’s basketball player and is a retired Spanish professional basketball player. He has a wife and three kids. He has played in Spain and Italy at club level and for the Spain national team. He became ACB champion in the 1999–2000 season.

Iturbe has represented Spain at EuroBasket 2005 and 2004 Summer Olympics.

References

External links
Liga ACB profile

1976 births
Living people
Basketball players at the 2004 Summer Olympics
Sportspeople from Vitoria-Gasteiz
CB Estudiantes players
Clemson Tigers men's basketball players
Liga ACB players
Olympic basketball players of Spain
Power forwards (basketball)
Real Madrid Baloncesto players
Small forwards
Spanish men's basketball players
Spanish expatriate basketball people in the United States
Basketball players from the Basque Country (autonomous community)